Manuel Gregorio Pelegrina  1920 – November 23, 1992) was an Argentine football forward that played most of his career for Estudiantes de La Plata. He is not only the highest scoring player in the history of the club with 227 goals but also the most capped player, having attended 489 matches for Estudiantes. Pelegrina is regarded as one of the best left-wingers ever in the history of Argentine football.

Besides, Pelegrina is ranked 7th. among the all-time Argentine Primera División top scorers with 231 goals in 490 matches, including his goals for Huracán. He won two titles with Estudiantes, Copa A. Escobar and Copa Gral. P. Ramírez.

Pelegrina was also capped for the Argentina national team, with which he won a Copa América in 1945.

Biography 

Pelegrina was born in San Vicente, Córdoba. He made his youth career at local Club Lavalle, where he showed his skills as scorer. His good performances drew attention of Estudiantes de La Plata and Rosario Central, but he finally signed for Estudiantes.

Nicknamed Payo, Pelegrina played a total of 18 seasons with Estudiantes, forming a great tandem with Carlos Cirico, his greatest assistant. He played for the club until their relegation in 1953 when he left with Ricardo Infante to join Huracán. Pellegrina only played one season with Huracán before returning to Estudiantes.

During his time at Estudiantes Pelegrina made a number of appearances for Argentina, including games at the South American Championship 1945

Pelegrina eventually left Estudiantes in 1956 after scoring 234 goals in 489 games for the club. He scored 221 goals in 261 games for Estudiantes in the Primera División. He then played for Defensores de Cambaceres in the lower leagues of Argentine football between 1957 and 1961.

Apart of being the Estudiantes' all-time topscorer, Pelegrina also holds the record of most goals scored in the "La Plata derby" with 11 goals.

Pelegrina died of pneumonia in La Plata on November 23, 1992.

Titles 
Estudiantes L.P
Copa Adrián C. Escobar (1): 1944
Copa Gral. P. Ramírez (1): 1945

Argentina
 Copa América (1): 1945

References

1920 births
1992 deaths
Footballers from Córdoba, Argentina
Argentine footballers
Argentina international footballers
Association football forwards
Estudiantes de La Plata footballers
Club Atlético Huracán footballers
Argentine Primera División players
Deaths from pneumonia in Argentina